"Flash Light" is a song by funk band Parliament, written by George Clinton, Bernie Worrell, and Bootsy Collins and released in January 28, 1978 on the album Funkentelechy Vs. the Placebo Syndrome. It was the first #1 R&B hit by any of the P-Funk groups and spent four months on the U.S. pop chart, peaking at #16.

Flashlight (also called “Flash Light”) is the final song on Parliament’s 1977 album Funkentelechy Vs. the Placebo Syndrome. The song finishes the album’s story of the group’s quest to defeat the evil Sir Nose d'Voidoffunk, coercing him to dance.

The track became Parliament's second certified million-selling single, following "Give Up the Funk (Tear the Roof Off the Sucker)". "Flash Light" also gave Casablanca Records its first #1 R&B hit. In New Zealand, the song reached #3 and is ranked as the #8 hit of 1978.  "Flash Light" also charted in Canada (#24) and reached #3 on WLS-AM in Chicago.

Background
The song's distinctive bass line is often attributed to Bootsy Collins and was originally written for him. However, Collins rejected the part and Bernie Worrell created the line on at least three, possibly four connected Minimoog synthesizers. Worrell also played all the song's keyboard parts. The New York Times described Worrell's synthesized bass as "[a] descending and ascending chromatic line with a meaty tone and a certain swagger, an approach that would spread through funk, new wave, electro, synth-pop and countless other iterations."

Collins contributed to the track by handling drum duties while his older brother Catfish Collins played rhythm guitar. Lead vocals were by bandleader Clinton. Clinton credited Worrell with the idea of composing the song under a motif. Starting out as a jam, Clinton recorded multiple tracks, layering up to 50 voices within the theme of an inclusive love song. The "Da da da dee da da da" chant was based on a chant from a dance at a bar mitzvah party that Clinton had heard from a friend.

Impact and legacy
"Flash Light" continued the "Fake the Funk/Your nose will grow/Sir Nose D'Voidoffunk" concept that began with Bootsy's Rubber Band's "The Pinocchio Theory". Its success would greatly influence not only funk music, but also new wave and hip-hop. The Houston Press ranked "Flash Light" as Clinton's most sampled song, finding more than 60 uses, including on Aaliyah's "Back and Forth" and UGK's "Protect and Serve". "Flash Light" was rated #75 in Tablet Magazine's list of 100 Best Jewish Songs. Rolling Stone ranked "Flash Light" #202 on its 2011 list of the 500 Greatest Songs of All Time. The song was sampled by Salt-N-Pepa in their 1986 hit "I'll Take Your Man", and in 2018 by the City Girls for their version of the song. Hip-hop group Digital Underground sampled the song for their hit "Doowutchyalike".

In popular culture

Clinton recorded a duet version of the song called "Flashlight (Spaceflight)" for the 1999 film Muppets from Space along with Bill Barretta as Pepe the King Prawn.

The song was used in the Guardians of the Galaxy Vol. 2 credits, and was included in the film's soundtrack.

Charts

Weekly charts

Certifications

References

External links
 Lyrics of this song
 

1977 songs
1978 singles
Funk songs
Parliament (band) songs
Songs written by George Clinton (funk musician)
Casablanca Records singles
Songs written by Bootsy Collins
Songs written by Bernie Worrell